Qaradeyin or Karadein or Karadigin may refer to:

Qaradeyin, Agdash, Azerbaijan
Qaradeyin, Qabala, Azerbaijan
Karadiğin, Erzincan